James Bannon may refer to:
 James Bannon (Irish politician) (born 1958), Irish Fine Gael politician
 James Bannon (Wisconsin politician) (1852–1938), American farmer and politician
 Jim Bannon (1911–1984), American actor and radio announcer
 Jimmy Bannon (1871–1948), American baseball player